Andrew Gillis is a Canadian actor and musician. He is most noted for his performance in the 2016 film Werewolf, for which he garnered a Canadian Screen Award nomination for Best Actor at the 5th Canadian Screen Awards. He also won the award for Best Actor at the 2016 Atlantic Film Festival, and was a nominee for Best Actor in a Canadian Film at the Vancouver Film Critics Circle Awards 2016.

From New Waterford, Nova Scotia, Gillis also performs as a musician with the band Rebecca's Room. He previously appeared in 4 Quarters, a short film by Werewolf director Ashley McKenzie, on which he was also credited as a cowriter. Gillis played a supporting role in Seth Smith's 2017 thriller The Crescent.

References

External links

Canadian male film actors
Canadian male screenwriters
Male actors from Nova Scotia
Musicians from Nova Scotia
Writers from Nova Scotia
Living people
People from New Waterford, Nova Scotia
Year of birth missing (living people)
21st-century Canadian screenwriters
21st-century Canadian male writers